LPK can refer to:
 Lipetsk Airport, Lipetsk, Russia (IATA code)
 Libby, Perszyk, Kathman Inc., brand design agency, founded 1983
 Lithuanian Confederation of Industrialists (LPK in Lithuanian acronym), lobby group founded in 1989
 Mazingira Green Party of Kenya, formerly known as the Liberal Party of Kenya
 People's Movement of Kosovo (LPK in Albanian acronym), Kosovar political party
 Pyruvate kinase, liver-specific